Ma Dunjing (1906–1972) was a prominent Muslim Ma Clique General in China during the Republic of China era, and was the son of General Ma Hongbin. Some sources give his birth date as 1901 rather than 1906. He fought against and defeated the Japanese in May 1938 in Suiyuan province during World War II, and he fought against the Communists in the Ningxia Campaign, but he defected to the Communists with his father, and led his 81st Corps to cross over to the communists. He died in Lanzhou in 1972.

Ma Dunjing's grandfather was General Ma Fulu who died fighting the foreigners in the Boxer Rebellion in Beijing in 1900. His family moved Ma Fulu's remains in 1995 from Beijing to Linxia County.

Service
1934 Commanding Officer 205th Regiment, 103rd Brigade, 35th Division
Commanding Officer 103rd Brigade, 35th Division
1937–1943 Chief of Staff 81st Army
1943–1946 General Officer Commanding 35th Division, 81st Army
1946–1947 General Officer Commanding 81st Division
1947–1948 Commander in Chief Haigu Army Group
1948–1949 General Officer Commanding 81st Army
1949 Revolts against the Nationalist Government
1949 Joins the People's Liberation Army

See also
 Ma clique

Notes

References
 The Generals of WWII, Generals from China, Lieutenant-General Ma Duijing
 Hutchings, Graham. Modern China. First. Cambridge, MA: Harvard University Press, 2001.

External links
 Rulers
 民国军阀派系谈 (The Republic of China warlord cliques discussed ) http://www.2499cn.com/junfamulu.htm

1906 births
1972 deaths
Ma clique
Republic of China warlords from Gansu
National Revolutionary Army generals from Gansu
Chinese Nationalist military figures
Members of the Kuomintang
Military personnel of the Republic of China in the Second Sino-Japanese War
People from Linxia
Chinese Muslim generals